Kenneth Nathaniel Taylor (May 8, 1917 – June 10, 2005) was an American publisher and author, better known as the creator of The Living Bible and the founder of Tyndale House, a Christian publishing company, and Living Bibles International.

Early life and education 
Taylor was born in Portland, Oregon. His parents were George and Charlotte Huff Taylor. His father was a Presbyterian minister. He graduated from high school in 1934 from Beaverton High School in Beaverton, OR and enrolled in Wheaton College in Wheaton, Illinois. He graduated from Wheaton in 1938. In 1940, Taylor began to work on a Th.D. at Dallas Theological Seminary. During the course of his studies he was offered the position of editor for HIS Magazine, headquartered in Chicago. Taylor moved back to Wheaton, began working at the magazine, and finished his theological degree at Northern Baptist Seminary.  He was a long-time member of College Church in Wheaton.

Bible translation 
Taylor worked briefly with Clyde Dennis, founder of Good News Publishers, on translating Gospel tracts and distributing them overseas. In 1947 he moved to Moody Bible Institute, where he served as Director of Moody Press (now called Moody Publishing) until 1963. During that time he assisted with distribution of Christian literature in Mexico.

Taylor developed a series of Bible stories with pictures for his own children to read in 1954. They were eventually published by Moody Press in a book called The Bible in Pictures for Little Eyes in 1962. This book has now sold more than 1.5 million copies. Taylor followed this volume with Stories for the Children's Hour and Devotions for the Children's Hour (both also published by Moody).

After these books were published Taylor began working on an ambitious project—the Bible in a paraphrased and easy-to-read modern language. He published the New Testament epistles under the title Living Letters at his own expense in 1962. His Bible paraphrase was successful enough to allow him to leave Moody Press and work exclusively at Tyndale. Taylor finished the entire Bible in contemporary language and published it as The Living Bible in 1971.

Taylor stepped down as chairman and CEO of Tyndale House in 1973, and was succeeded by his son, Mark D. Taylor, who kept the position until 2020.

A special edition of Taylor's Living Bible was published in 1984 in conjunction with a marketing campaign sponsored by the Christian Broadcasting Network. This edition, titled The Book, was featured in People magazine.

Death 
Taylor died on June 10, 2005, from heart failure.

Kenneth N. Taylor Lifetime Achievement Award
Since 1981, the Evangelical Christian Publishers Association (ECPA) has presented lifetime achievement awards to those who have significantly impacted the Christian publishing industry. In 1984, Taylor was the second recipient of that award. In 2017, to reflect the impact Taylor had on the Christian publishing industry, the award program was renamed the Kenneth N. Taylor Lifetime Achievement Award.

Books Authored by Kenneth N. Taylor

INTERVARSITY PRESS
Is Christianity Credible?, 1948

MOODY PRESS
Stories for the Children's Hour, 1953
Devotions for the Children's Hour, 1954
Lost on the Trail, 1954<div>
The Bible in Pictures for Little Eyes, 1956
Living Thoughts for the Children's Hour, 1958 (originally, I See)
A Living Letter for the Children's Hour, 1968 (originally, Romans for the Children's Hour, 1959)
The New Testament in Pictures for Little Eyes, 1989
The New Bible in Pictures for Little Eyes, 2002

TYNDALE HOUSE PUBLISHERS
Living Letters, 1962
Living Prophecies, 1965
Living Gospels, 1966
The Living New Testament, 1967
Living Psalms and Proverbs, 1967
Living Lessons of Life and Love, 1968
Almost Twelve, 1968
Living Books of Moses, 1969
Living History of Israel, 1970
Taylor's Bible Story Book, 1970
The Living Bible, 1971
Creation and Evolution, 1977
Living Bible Story Book, 1979
Lost on the Trail (revised edition), 1980
What High School Students Should Know about Creation, 1983 (originally, Creation and the High School Student, 1969)
Big Thoughts for Little People, 1983
Giant Steps for Little People, 1985
Wise Words for Little People, 1987
Next Steps for New Christians, 1989 (originally, How to Grow, Oliver-Nelson Books, 1985)
My First Bible in Pictures, 1989
The Bible for Children (coeditor), 1990
Good News for Little People, 1991
My Life: A Guided Tour, 1991 (updated 2002)
Stories about Jesus, 1994 (adapted from Good News for Little People)
Everything a Child Should Know about God, 1996
My First Bible Words (with William Noller), 1998
Family Devotions for Children, 1999
Right Choices, 1999
A Child's First Bible (DK series), 2000
Family-Time Bible, 2003 (originally, The Family-Time Bible in Pictures, 1992)

See also
New Living Translation

References

External links
Kenneth Taylor biography - biographical sketch from the Kenneth Taylor collection at Wheaton College
My Life: A Guided Tour - Autobiography by Kenneth N. Taylor

American Christian writers
1917 births
2005 deaths
Translators of the Bible into English
Dallas Theological Seminary alumni
Wheaton College (Illinois) alumni
20th-century translators
Northern Baptist Theological Seminary alumni
Writers from Wheaton, Illinois